Abigail Spears and Katarina Srebotnik were the defending champions, but chose not to compete together. Spears played alongside Alicja Rosolska, but lost in the first round to Mihaela Buzărnescu and Alizé Cornet. Srebotnik teamed up with Shuko Aoyama, but lost in the first round to Anastasia Pavlyuchenkova and Olga Savchuk.

Gabriela Dabrowski and Jeļena Ostapenko won the title, defeating Andreja Klepač and María José Martínez Sánchez in the final, 6–3, 6–3.

Seeds
The top four seeds received a bye into the second round.

Draw

Finals

Top half

Bottom half

References
Main Draw

Women's Doubles